Stigmella castaneaefoliella is a moth of the family Nepticulidae. It is found in North America in Kentucky, Ohio, Virginia, Illinois, Pennsylvania, New Jersey, Massachusetts, Florida and Ontario.

The wingspan is 4-4.5 mm.

The larvae feed on Castanea species, including Castanea dentata. They mine the leaves of their host plant. The larvae form very long, much contorted, linear mines with a fine central line of frass. The larva is bright green, the cocoon is ochraceous.

External links
Nepticulidae of North America
A taxonomic revision of the North American species of Stigmella (Lepidoptera: Nepticulidae)

Nepticulidae
Moths of North America
Moths described in 1875